Poplar Creek is a tributary of the Clinch River in Anderson and Roane counties in East Tennessee.

See also
List of rivers of Tennessee

References

Rivers of Tennessee
Tributaries of the Tennessee River
Rivers of Anderson County, Tennessee
Rivers of Roane County, Tennessee